Heinz Moser (born 12 October 1967) is a retired Swiss football defender and later manager.

Honours

Player
FC Sion
Swiss Cup: 1994–95, 1995–96

References

1967 births
Living people
Swiss men's footballers
FC Luzern players
BSC Young Boys players
FC Sion players
FC Thun players
Association football defenders
Swiss Super League players
Swiss football managers